Ebbe Harald Lieberath, (June 25, 1871 in Malmö  November 1, 1937 in Stockholm), was a Swedish military officer, writer and pioneer of Swedish Scouting.

Background
Lieberath was a physical education teacher in Gothenburg, when he during a boat trip he found a copy of Scouting for Boys by Robert Baden-Powell. There are divided opinions about how Lieberath came in contact with the book. One version claims that it lay on a table in the lounge on board, Lieberath sat down and started to read the book and was thus inspired to try Scouting in Sweden. The second version claims that he had been sleeping on the boat, and the book fell into his lap. Lieberath translated Scouting for Boys to Swedish in 1909.

He formed the first organized Scout group in Sweden, Riddarpojkarna in Gothenburg. At the same time Lieberath started a magazine of the Swedish Scout Movement. The magazine survived only six months. Thanks to his translation of the book and personal boosting, Scouting ideas spread in Sweden. Lieberath co-founded the Swedish Guide and Scout Association in the Crown Prince Hotel in Stockholm in 1912. The union was not the first Scout association in Sweden, (the YMCA's Scout association was first), but it was the first organization of free association. Lieberath was Scouting director of the Swedish Guide and Scout Association for many years. In 1920 he was awarded the first Silver Wolf Award, Swedish Scouting's highest award.

Lieberath wrote some thirty books for young people, such as Klämmiga pojkar (Spirited Boys) (1924).

Ebbe Lieberathsgatan neighborhood in Gothenburg was named in 1946 in memory of Lieberath, who spent his childhood in the district.

His nephew, the then 13-year-old Allan Evers, received the Scout Movement's finest award Gold Cross in January 1915, for having saved people from drowning three times, at the risk of his own life.

References

Scouting and Guiding in Sweden
1871 births
1937 deaths